Ambareesh was an Indian film actor who appeared predominantly in Kannada films. Besides Kannada, he has also acted in Tamil, Malayalam, Telugu and Hindi films.

Filmography

References

External links
 

Male actor filmographies
Indian filmographies